James Adomian (born January 31, 1980) is an American stand-up comedian, actor, and impressionist. He is best known for his work on Comedy Bang! Bang!, Chapo Trap House, Last Comic Standing, The Late Late Show with Craig Ferguson where he impersonated President George W. Bush until 2009, and for portraying Bernie Sanders during the 2016 Trump vs. Bernie tour. He voices Talking Ben in the Talking Tom and Friends animated series.

Early life
Adomian was born in Omaha, Nebraska, on January 31, 1980, and raised in Atlanta, Georgia. His family moved to Los Angeles, when he was ten years old.<ref>[https://www.timeout.com/chicago/comedy/james-adomian James Adomian: An up-and-comer hits the Lodge.], timeout.com,  October 4, 2011</ref> Adomian is an alumnus of Los Angeles Baptist High School and attended Whittier College studying in a self-designed major in Economics and Theatre Arts. He notes that he did not graduate during a 2017 interview with Pete Holmes. Adomian is of partial Armenian descent.

Career
Adomian began appearing as President George W. Bush frequently on The Late Late Show after Craig Ferguson took over hosting the show in January 2005 until 2009.

He has appeared on several other comedy programs, including MADtv, Mind of Mencia, Jimmy Kimmel Live!, Short Circuitz, Atom TV, Cavemen, Recount and Players.

Adomian has appeared in the films Harold & Kumar Escape from Guantanamo Bay and Miss March.

As a voice-over artist, Adomian performed on The Onion Radio News, as several recurring characters on the PBS cartoon series WordGirl, as President Bush on a few episodes of MADtv, as Jimmy Kimmel on Celebrity Deathmatch, and on a number of other cartoons.

In 2011, he was cast as a co-lead in the unaired Kari Lizer pilot project for NBC alongside Sarah Paulson and Tim Meadows.

In 2012, Adomian appeared on Comedy Bang! Bang! as PBS broadcaster Huell Howser, on Adult Swim's Childrens Hospital as Madonna, and on MTV's Money from Strangers as himself, also making regular appearances as various sketch characters on Conan.

In 2018, Adomian was one of the headliners at the Portland Queer Comedy Festival.

For the Freddie Mercury episode of the 2019 Netflix program Historical Roasts, Adomian played the title character.

Stand-up comedy album
In 2012, Adomian released his debut comedy album Low Hangin Fruit. The release was the first album released by Earwolf, and received mostly positive reviews. The one-hour stand-up set features personal stories, a number of celebrity impressions and political material including observations regarding the cultural perceptions of LGBT people.

Live appearances

Adomian frequently performs live at Upright Citizens Brigade Theatre in sketch and stand-up shows such as Comedy Bang! Bang!, Who Charted?, and many others. He is also an alumnus of the Sunday Company at The Groundlings Theatre, where he still frequently performs. He also regularly performs at "The Tomorrow Show" and other stand-up shows in Hollywood. Adomian is known for doing many impressions at live shows, both in-costume and as part of his standup act, including Vincent Price, Lewis Black, Orson Welles, Jesse Ventura, Paul Giamatti, Michael Caine, Philip Seymour Hoffman, Sam Elliott, Al Franken, Huell Howser, Christopher Hitchens, Gary Busey, John McCain, Joe Lieberman, Marc Maron, Jimmy Kimmel, Andy Kindler, Tom Leykis, Todd Glass, George W. Bush, and Bernie Sanders. He has performed several impressions as recurring characters on Comedy Bang! Bang!Adomian often makes live appearances around the country doing standup or characters, particularly at left-wing political events like YearlyKos, Laughing Liberally, the National Conference for Media Reform and campaign events for Congressman Alan Grayson. In 2010, he made several live standup appearances across North America in the Breaking Even tour.

In 2008, he appeared with comedian Greg Giraldo at venues around the country as part of the Indecision '08 Tour produced by Comedy Central. He has performed at comedy festivals across North America, including Just for Laughs in Montreal. In March 2012, Adomian had his first overseas appearance, headlining a sold-out two night show in Seoul, South Korea for Stand Up Seoul.

Adomian toured the US with the Trump vs. Bernie'' tour in February–March 2016.

Personal life
Adomian is gay. He is the grandson of Armenian-American mathematician George Adomian. He is a member of the Democratic Socialists of America.

Filmography

Film

Television

References

External links
 
 

1980 births
Living people
Male actors from Omaha, Nebraska
American male comedians
American male film actors
American impressionists (entertainers)
American people of Armenian descent
American sketch comedians
American stand-up comedians
American male television actors
American male voice actors
American podcasters
American gay actors
Last Comic Standing contestants
Gay comedians
LGBT people from Nebraska
Armenian LGBT people
Members of the Democratic Socialists of America
Cultural depictions of George W. Bush
Whittier College alumni
21st-century American male actors
Upright Citizens Brigade Theater performers
21st-century American comedians
American LGBT comedians